The Anticapitalist and Communist List was a communist coalition of political parties in Italy, formed in the run-up to the 2009 European Parliament election in order to overcome the 4% threshold introduced by the new electoral law.

The list included:
Communist Refoundation Party (PRC, communist, leader: Paolo Ferrero)
Party of Italian Communists (PdCI, communist, leader: Oliviero Diliberto)
Socialism 2000 (PRC, democratic-socialist, leader: Cesare Salvi)
United Consumers (CU, consumer protection, leader: Bruno De Vita)

The formation of the list marked the first time that the PRC and the PdCI presented a joint list since the 1998 split, let alone The Left – The Rainbow in the 2008 general election. The list may be the start of a process of re-union of the two major communist parties of Italy, that had been anyway reduced in their electoral strength since then.

The Workers's Communist Party and Critical Left, two more break-away groups from the PRC, declined the invitation to take part to the list, while Salvi and his group left Democratic Left in order to join. Democratic Left and the reformist wing of the PRC took part in Left and Freedom along with the Federation of the Greens and the Socialist Party, while the Worker's Communist Party and Critical Left chose to run their own lists.

The list received 3.4% of the national vote and failed to return any MEPs.

In December 2009 the list was transformed into Federation of the Left.

References

External links
Official website

Anti-capitalist organizations
Communist organisations in Italy
Defunct political party alliances in Italy
History of the Communist Refoundation Party

fr:Liste anticapitaliste (Italie)
it:Lista Comunista Anticapitalista